Perdita is a large genus of small bees native to North America, particularly diverse in the desert regions of the United States and Mexico. There are over 600 currently recognized species of Perdita, plus more than 100 additional subspecies and many more species that remain undescribed. Perdita are usually quite small (2.0 mm to 10.0 mm) and often brightly colored with metallic reflections and/or yellow or white markings, and among the few lineages of bees incapable of stinging. The genus was extensively treated by P.H. Timberlake who, in addition to T.D.A. Cockerell, described most of the known species. Most species are extreme specialists (oligoleges) with respect to pollen and will only collect pollen from a few closely related species or genera of plants.  Many species in this genus are called fairy bees.
 
They may be parasitized by Neolarra cuckoo bees, which lay eggs in their nests given the opportunity.

See also
 List of Perdita species

References

External links
Perdita Identification Guide (female)
Perdita Identification Guide (male)
List of Species
Worldwide Species Map
Bugguide

Andrenidae
Bee genera